Alternanthera snodgrassii is a species of plant in the family Amaranthaceae. It is endemic to Ecuador.

References

Flora of Ecuador
snodgrassii
Vulnerable plants
Taxonomy articles created by Polbot